Robert Spain is an American businessman and politician from Bradford, Vermont who spent two terms as a Republican member of the Vermont House of Representatives' 3rd Orange County district (Bradford and Corinth) from 1993 to 1996 before being unseated by Democrat Wayne G. Kenyon in 1996, just as Spain had defeated incumbent Kenyon in 1992.

References 

20th-century American businesspeople
Republican Party members of the Vermont House of Representatives
20th-century American politicians
People from Bradford, Vermont